The Black Liberation Army (BLA) was a far-left, black nationalist, underground Black Power revolutionary paramilitary organization that operated in the United States from 1970 to 1981. Composed of former Black Panthers (BPP) and Republic of New Afrika (RNA) members who served above ground before going underground, the organization's program was one of war against the United States government, and its stated goal was to "take up arms for the liberation and self-determination of black people in the United States." The BLA carried out a series of bombings, killings of police officers and drug dealers, robberies (which participants termed "expropriations"), and prison breaks.

Formation
The Black Liberation Army gained strength as Black Panther Party membership declined. By 1970, police and FBI sabotage (see COINTELPRO), infiltration, sectarianism, the lengthy prison sentences, and death of key members (among them Fred Hampton) had significantly undermined the Black Panther Party. This convinced many former party members of the desirability of underground existence, seeing that a new period of violent repression by the U.S federal and local government was at hand. BLA members operated under the belief that only through covert means, including but not limited to retribution, could the movement be continued until such a time when an above-ground existence was possible. The conditions under which the Black Liberation Army formed are not entirely clear. It is commonly believed that the organization was founded by those who left the Black Panther Party after Eldridge Cleaver was expelled from the party's Central Committee. A fallout between Cleaver and other Panther leaders followed from his public criticism of the BPP, among other things accusing Panther social programs of being reformist rather than revolutionary. Others, including black revolutionary Geronimo Pratt (AKA Geronimo ji Jaga), assert that the BLA "as a movement concept pre-dated and was broader than the BPP," suggesting that it was a refuge for ex-Panthers rather than a new organization formed through schism. Assata Shakur, in her autobiography, Assata: An Autobiography, asserts:"… the Black Liberation Army was not a centralized, organized group with a common leadership and chain of command. Instead, there were various organizations and collectives working together and simultaneously  independent of each other." One such organization was the Philadelphia-based Black Unity Council, which renamed itself the Black Liberation Army in 1970, independent of BLA groups in New York and DC.

Maxwell Stanford, founder of the Revolutionary Action Movement (RAM), cites the Black Guards, a wing of the RAM, as direct BLA forerunners.

The newly formed BLA believed that "the character of reformism is based on unprincipled class collaboration with our enemy" and asserted the following principles:
 That we are anti-capitalist, anti-imperialist, anti-racist, and anti-sexist.
 That we must of necessity strive for the abolishment of these systems and for the institution of Socialistic relationships in which Black people have total and absolute control over their own destiny as a people.
 That in order to abolish our systems of oppression, we must utilize the science of class struggle, develop this science as it relates to our unique national condition.

Activities

1970-72: Attacks
According to a Justice Department report on BLA activity, the Black Liberation Army was suspected of involvement in over 70 incidents of violence between 1970 and 1976. The Fraternal Order of Police blamed the BLA for the murders of 13 police officers.

On October 22, 1970, the BLA was believed to have planted a bomb in St. Brendan's Church in San Francisco while it was full of mourners attending the funeral of San Francisco police officer Harold Hamilton, who had been killed in the line of duty while responding to a bank robbery. The bomb was detonated, but no one in the church suffered serious injuries.

On May 21, 1971, as many as five men participated in the murder of two New York City police officers, Joseph Piagentini and Waverly Jones. Those arrested and brought to trial for the shootings include Anthony Bottom (a.k.a. Jalil Muntaqim), Albert Washington, Francisco Torres, Gabriel Torres, and Herman Bell.

On August 29, 1971, three armed men murdered 51-year-old San Francisco police sergeant John Victor Young while he was working at a desk in his police station, which was almost empty at the time due to a bombing attack on a bank that took place earlier - only one other officer and a civilian clerk were there. Two days later, the San Francisco Chronicle received a letter signed by the BLA claiming responsibility for the attack.

On November 3, 1971, Officer James R. Greene of the Atlanta Police Department was shot and killed in his patrol van at a gas station. His wallet, badge, and weapon were taken, and the evidence at the scene pointed to two suspects. The first was Twymon Meyers, who was killed in a police shootout in 1973, and the second was Freddie Hilton (a.k.a. Kamau Sadiki), who evaded capture until 2002, when he was arrested in New York City on a separate charge and was recognized as one of the men wanted in the Greene murder. Apparently, the two men had attacked the officer to gain standing with their compatriots within Black Liberation Army.

On January 27, 1972, the Black Liberation Army assassinated police officers Gregory Foster and Rocco Laurie at the corner of 174 Avenue B in New York City. After the killings, a note sent to authorities portrayed the murders as a retaliation for the prisoner deaths during 1971 Attica prison riot. To date, no arrests have been made. Two of the three suspects died in "unrelated shootouts with cops — one in New York, and one in St. Louis, with Laurie’s gun in his car" and the third was sentenced in 2016 to 21 years for selling heroin to undercover police. Evidence found at the scene has been lost.

1972-79: Actions and flights

On July 31, 1972, five armed individuals hijacked Delta Air Lines Flight 841 en route from Detroit to Miami, eventually collecting a ransom of $1 million and diverting the plane, after passengers were released, to Algeria. The authorities there seized the ransom but allowed the group to flee. Four were eventually caught by French authorities in Paris, where they were convicted of various crimes, but one—George Wright—remained a fugitive until September 26, 2011, when he was captured in Portugal. Portuguese courts rejected the initial pledge for extradition. American authorities may still appeal this decision.

In another high-profile incident, Assata Shakur, Zayd Shakur and Sundiata Acoli were said to have opened fire on state troopers in New Jersey after being pulled over for a broken taillight. Zayd Shakur and state trooper Werner Foerster were both killed during the exchange. Following her capture, Assata Shakur was tried in six different criminal trials. According to Shakur, she was beaten and tortured during her incarceration in a number of different federal and state prisons. The charges ranged from kidnapping to assault and battery to bank robbery. Assata Shakur was found guilty of the murder of both Foerster and her companion Zayd Shakur, but escaped prison in 1979 and eventually fled to Cuba and received political asylum. Acoli was convicted of killing Foerster and sentenced to life in prison.

1981: Brinks robbery

The BLA was active in the US until at least 1981 when a Brinks truck robbery, conducted with support from former Weather Underground members Kathy Boudin, David Gilbert and Judith Alice Clark, left a guard and two police officers dead. Boudin, Gilbert and Clark along with several BLA and M19CO members, were subsequently arrested.

Aftermath

Anarchist sympathies

Following the collapse of the BLA, some members - including Ashanti Alston, Donald Weems (a.k.a. Kuwasi Balagoon) and Ojore N. Lutalo - became outspoken proponents of anarchism. Weems died in prison of an AIDS-related disease in 1986. Alston remains active in prison support and other activist circles. Lutalo was released from prison in 2009 after serving 28 years on charges related to a shootout with a drug dealer in 1981 (and parole violation stemming from his conviction for a 1975 bank robbery), during which time he was punished with solitary confinement for receiving anarchist literature. While incarcerated, the Anarchist Black Cross Federation gave him support.

On January 26, 2010, Lutalo was arrested for endangering public transportation while on the Amtrak train to New Jersey after attending the Anarchist Book Fair in Los Angeles, being mistakenly identified as making terrorist threats on his cell phone. The charge was dropped for lack of evidence, and Lutalo settled a suit  against the city of La Junta, Colorado, where his arrest was made, for an undisclosed amount.

Later trials

In January 2007, eight men, labelled the San Francisco 8 were charged by a joint state and federal task force with John Young's murder. The defendants have been identified as former members of the Black Liberation Army. A similar case was dismissed in 1975 when a judge ruled that police gathered evidence through the use of torture. On June 29, 2009, Herman Bell pleaded guilty to voluntary manslaughter in the death of Sgt. Young. In July 2009, charges were dropped against four of the accused: Ray Boudreaux, Henry W. Jones, Richard Brown and Harold Taylor. That same month, Jalil Muntaquim pleaded no contest to conspiracy to commit voluntary manslaughter becoming the second person to be convicted in this case.

List of members and associates
BLA members in prison as of 2023 include the following:

 Ruchell 'Cinque' Magee; survivor of Marin County Civic Center attacks.
 Kojo Bomani Sababu (formerly Grailing Brown); convicted of bank robbery in 1975.
 Kamau Sadiki (formerly Freddie Hilton); convicted on October 13, 2002, and was sentenced to life in prison for the 1971 murder of Atlanta police officer Jim Greene.
 Fred ‘Muhammad’ Burton; one of the Philadelphia Five.
 Joseph Bowen.

BLA fugitives:
 Assata Shakur (formerly JoAnne Chesimard); named on the Most Wanted list by the FBI—the first woman ever to make the list. She is believed to be living in Cuba under political asylum. She escaped custody in 1979 after being convicted in the May 2, 1973 murder of New Jersey State Trooper Werner Foerster. Shakur has been cited as an inspiration by Black Lives Matter co-founder Alicia Garza.
 George Wright; escaped convict and 1972 hijacker; living in Portugal, which has refused to extradite him to the U.S.

Other BLA members and associates:
 Sundiata Acoli (formerly Clark Edward Squire); convicted along with Assata Shakur of the murder of a New Jersey state trooper in 1973. Released in May 2022.F
 Mutulu Shakur (formerly Jeral Wayne Williams); charged with conspiracy in 1979 BLA prison break of Assata Shakur, FBI's top ten Fugitive #380. Captured in 1986 and convicted in 1988 of participating in the 1981 Brinks robbery, he received a 60-year sentence in a federal prison. Incarcerated in Victorville, he was released in December 2022. Shakur is stepfather to the late rap artist Tupac.
 Russell Maroon Shoatz (August 23, 1943 – December 17, 2021); convicted of the murder of a police officer in 1972. Died 2021.
 Jalil Muntaqim (formerly Anthony Bottom); one of the New York Three convicted of killing two policemen. Released from prison in October 2020 after over 49 years of incarceration and 11 parole denials.
 Kuwasi Balagoon (formerly Donald Weems); one of the Panther 21 and later convicted for involvement in the 1981 Brink's robbery. Died in prison 13th December 1986.
 Jamal Joseph; American writer, director, producer, poet, activist, and educator. Member of the Black Panther Party and the Black Liberation Army. He was prosecuted as one of the Panther 21 and spent six years incarcerated at Leavenworth Penitentiary.
 Sekou Odinga (formerly Nathaniel Burns); one of the Panther 21 and later convicted of six counts of attempted murder for participation in the 1981 Brink's robbery and other incidents. Released 2014.
 Dhoruba bin Wahad (formerly Richard Earl Moore); one of the Panther 21, co-founder of the BLA, and established the Campaign to Free Black and New African Political Prisoners. Convicted for attempted murder in 1973 and released in 1990, subsequently winning lawsuits against the FBI and NYPD.
 Safiya Bukhari (formerly Bernice Jones); convicted on multiple charges in 1975, escaped 1976, recaptured 1977, paroled 1983.
 Ashanti Alston; convicted for bank robbery in 1974. Released 1985.
 Bashir Hameed (formerly James Dixon York) (died in prison August 30, 2008) and Anthony LaBorde (a.k.a. Abdul Majid) (died in prison on April 3, 2016); convicted of the murder of a police officer in 1981.
 David Gilbert and Kathy Boudin; both sent to prison for their role in the 1981 Brink's robbery. Gilbert was released in 2021. Boudin was released in 2003 and died in 2022.
 Judith Alice Clark; convicted for participation in the 1981 Brink's robbery. Released in 2019.
 Marilyn Buck; convicted for participation in the 1981 Brink's robbery, the escape of Assata Shakur, and other incidents. Released and died in 2010.
 Silvia Baraldini; convicted in 1983 for participation in BLA actions. Repatriated in 1999 and paroled in 2006.
 Susan Rosenberg; convicted in 1985 for possession of explosives, released 2001.
 Arthur Lee Washington Jr.; FBI Ten Most Wanted Fugitive #427, wanted for 1989 attempted murder of a New Jersey state trooper. Removed from list in December 2000 as no longer meeting criteria.
 Albert Washington (died in prison April 28, 2000) and Herman Bell (released 2018); two of the New York Three convicted of the murder of two New York City police officers in 1971.
 Robert Seth Hayes; convicted of the murder of a NYC Transit Police Officer. Released in 2018 and died in 2019.
 John Leo Thomas; Leader of the Atlanta, GA cell.
 Ronald Anderson; member of the Atlanta cell.
 Avon White; member of the Atlanta cell.
 Robert Brown; member of the Atlanta cell.
 Ojore N. Lutalo; convicted following a shootout with a drug dealer. Released August 2009.
 William Turk (a.k.a. Sekou Kambui); convicted of two murders in Alabama. Released 2014.
 Anthony White (a.k.a. Kimu Olugbala), and Woodie Greene (a.k.a. Changa Olugbala); died in shooting 1973.
 Harold Russell; died in shooting 1971.
 Frank 'Heavy' Fields, died in shooting 1971.
 Ronald Carter; died in shooting 1972.
 Zayd Malik Shakur (formerly James F. Coston); died in shooting 1973.
 Twymon Ford Myers, died in shooting 1973.
 Timothy Adams; died in shooting 1973.
 Alfred Butler; died in shooting 1975.
 Melvin Kearney; died in escape attempt, 1976.
 John Clark Andaliwa; died in shooting, 1976.
 Samuel Smith (a.k.a. Mtayari Shabaka Sundiata); died in shooting, 1981.
 Wayne 'Musa' Henderson; died in shooting following a prison escape, 1977
 Arthur 'Cetawayo' Johnson
 Robert 'Saeed' Joyner
 Cliff 'Lumumba' Futch
 Phyliss 'Oshun' Hill

See also
 Badge of the Assassin
 Weather Underground
 May 19th Communist Organization
 Black Guerrilla Family
 Republic of New Afrika
 Black Revolutionary Assault Team
 George Jackson Brigade
 Symbionese Liberation Army
 Vanguardism
 Propaganda of the deed
 New Black Panther Party
 Black Lives Matter

References

Sources
 Foster and Laurie by Al Silverman. Published by Little and Brown, 1974. .
 Days of Rage: America's Radical Underground, the FBI, and the Forgotten Age of Revolutionary Violence by Bryan Burrough. Published by Penguin Publishing Group, 2016. .

External links
Incidents attributed to the BLA on the START GTD database

 
1970 establishments in the United States
1981 disestablishments in the United States
African and Black nationalism in the United States
African-American socialism
American bank robbers
Anti-capitalist organizations
Clandestine groups
Far-left politics in the United States
New Left
Organizations disestablished in 1981
Organizations established in 1970
Post–civil rights era in African-American history
Secessionist organizations in the United States
Socialism in the United States
Terrorism in the United States